Events in the year 1179 in Norway.

Incumbents
Monarch: Magnus V Erlingsson

Events
19 June - The , between Sverre Sigurdsson and Erling Skakke.

Arts and literature

Births

Deaths
Erling Skakke, earl (born c. 1115).

References

Norway